Lenarty  (historical variants Lenharten, Lenahrdten) is a village in the administrative district of Gmina Olecko, within Olecko County, Warmian-Masurian Voivodeship, in northern Poland. 

Notable residents
 Theodor Tolsdorff (1909-1978), Wehrmacht general

References

Lenarty